Triple Play is an album by American jazz saxophonist Johnny Hodges recorded in 1967 and released on the RCA Victor label.

Reception

Allmusic says "Despite the many changes in personnel, the music is pretty consistent, with basic swinging originals, blues and ballads all heard in equal proportion. As usual, Johnny Hodges ends up as the main star". In JazzTimes, Stanley Dance called it a "happy, unpretentious set".

Track listing
All compositions by Johnny Hodges except where noted.

 "Take 'Em Off, Take 'Em Off Part 1" – 3:39 	
 "Take 'Em Off, Take 'Em Off Part 2" – 2:56 	
 "The Nearness of You" (Hoagy Carmichael, Ned Washington) – 3:46
 "Monkey on a Limb" – 3:53 
 "A Tiny Bit of Blues" – 4:53
 "For Jammers Only" (Claude Bolling) – 3:02
 "On the Way Up" – 2:52
 "Big Boy Blues" – 3:20 
 "The Very Thought of You" (Ray Noble) – 2:49
 "Fur Piece" – 6:22
 "Sir John" – 3:19
 "Figurine" – 2:39  	
 "C Jam Blues" (Duke Ellington, Barney Bigard) – 4:21

Personnel

Johnny Hodges – alto saxophone
Cat Anderson – trumpet 
Roy Eldridge – trumpet 
Ray Nance – cornet 
Benny Powell – trombone 
Buster Cooper – trombone 
Lawrence Brown – trombone 
Jimmy Hamilton – tenor saxophone 
Paul Gonsalves – tenor saxophone 
Harry Carney – baritone saxophone 
Bill Berry – vibraphone 
Hank Jones – piano 
Jimmy Jones – piano
Nat Pierce – piano 
Billy Butler – guitar 
Tiny Grimes – guitar 
Les Spann – guitar 
Aaron Bell – double bass 
Joe Benjamin – double bass 
Milt Hinton – double bass  
Oliver Jackson – drums 
Gus Johnson – drums 
Rufus Jones – drums

References

Johnny Hodges albums
1967 albums
RCA Records albums